In Greek mythology, Proetus (Ancient Greek: Προῖτος Proitos) may refer to the following personages:

Proetus, king of Argos and Tiryns, son of Abas and twin brother of Acrisius.
Proetus, a prince of Corinth as the son of Prince Thersander, son of King Sisyphus. He was the father of Maera who died a maiden. Scholiasts on the Odyssey confound him with the Argive Proetus.
Proetus of Thebes, eponym of the Proetid Gates, and father of Galanthis.
Proetus of Nauplia, a son of Nauplius I and father of Lernus.
Proetus, a son of Agenor (?). It is unclear whether Stephanus is referring to a son of Agenor named Proetus, or to the Argive Proetus as a descendant of Agenor.

Notes

References 

 Antoninus Liberalis, The Metamorphoses of Antoninus Liberalis translated by Francis Celoria (Routledge 1992). Online version at the Topos Text Project.
 Apollodorus, The Library with an English Translation by Sir James George Frazer, F.B.A., F.R.S. in 2 Volumes, Cambridge, MA, Harvard University Press; London, William Heinemann Ltd. 1921. ISBN 0-674-99135-4. Online version at the Perseus Digital Library. Greek text available from the same website.
Apollonius Rhodius, Argonautica translated by Robert Cooper Seaton (1853-1915), R. C. Loeb Classical Library Volume 001. London, William Heinemann Ltd, 1912. Online version at the Topos Text Project.
 Apollonius Rhodius, Argonautica. George W. Mooney. London. Longmans, Green. 1912. Greek text available at the Perseus Digital Library.
 Pausanias, Description of Greece with an English Translation by W.H.S. Jones, Litt.D., and H.A. Ormerod, M.A., in 4 Volumes. Cambridge, MA, Harvard University Press; London, William Heinemann Ltd. 1918. . Online version at the Perseus Digital Library
Pausanias, Graeciae Descriptio. 3 vols. Leipzig, Teubner. 1903.  Greek text available at the Perseus Digital Library.
 Stephanus of Byzantium, Stephani Byzantii Ethnicorum quae supersunt, edited by August Meineike (1790-1870), published 1849. A few entries from this important ancient handbook of place names have been translated by Brady Kiesling. Online version at the Topos Text Project.

Argive characters in Greek mythology
Corinthian characters in Greek mythology
Theban characters in Greek mythology
Corinthian mythology
Mythology of Argolis
Theban mythology